1st Brigade Combat Team or 1 BCT is a modularized brigade of the United States Army.

1st Brigade Combat Team may also refer to:

 1st Brigade Combat Team, 1st Infantry Division (United States)
 1st Brigade Combat Team, 1st Armored Division (United States)
 1st Brigade Combat Team, 1st Cavalry Division (United States)
 1st Brigade Combat Team, 2nd Infantry Division (United States)
 1st Brigade Combat Team, 3rd Infantry Division (United States)
 1st Brigade Combat Team, 4th Infantry Division (United States)
 1st Brigade Combat Team, 10th Mountain Division (United States)
 1st Brigade Combat Team, 25th Infantry Division (United States)
 1st Brigade Combat Team, 82nd Airborne Division
 1st Brigade Combat Team, 101st Airborne Division (United States)

See also
 1st Division (disambiguation)
 1st Brigade (disambiguation)
 1st Regiment (disambiguation)
 1 Squadron (disambiguation)